Vilusi is a village in the municipality of Nikšić, Montenegro. It is the village closest the Klobuk border crossing with Bosnia and Herzegovina (for Trebinje) though the actual main road does not go through the heart of the village.

History 
In antiquity, Vilusi had a castle, named Salthua.

Demographics
According to the 2011 census, the village was inhabited by 87 Montenegrins and 75 Serbs. According to the 2003 census, the village was inhabited by 113 Serbs and 91 Montenegrins.

References

Bibliography

External links 
 Location

Populated places in Nikšić Municipality
Serb communities in Montenegro